Leyla Selen Uçer (born 5 May 1983) is a Turkish actress, best known for her role in the movie Ara and the play Bug.

Life and career 
Uçer's parents were chemical engineers. She studied at St. George's Austrian High School and graduated from Boğaziçi University with a degree in chemistry. During her university years, she joined the Boğaziçi University acting club. She also attended the Istanbul University State Conservatory Singing Department. She studied at the Academy Istanbul with a scholarship for a year. She also completed her master's degree at Roosevelt University in Chicago with a scholarship. The play she wrote, American Dream, was staged by Ensemble Theater on Off-Broadway.

Upon returning to Turkey, she was cast in the movie Anlat İstanbul, written by Ümit Ünal, in 2004. She also appeared in Külkedisi, directed by Selim Demirdelen. She then took part in DOT's adaptation of Bug. With her performance in Haldun Dormen's Kantocu at Istanbul City Theatres, she was nominated for the Best Supporting Actress in a Musical or Comedy award at the Afife Jale Awards. She had a leading role in the 2007 movie Ara, directed by Ümit Ünal, portraying the character of Gül. For this role, she shared the Best Actress award at the 15th International Adana Film Festival with Ayça Damgacı. In 2008, she appeared as a prostitute in O... Çocukları. In 2009, she played the role of Emel in Binbir Gece. In the same year, she was cast in Hanımın Çiftliği as Asuman.

Awards 
 39th International Istanbul Film Festival: "Best Actress" - Aşk Büyü vs. - 2020
 15th Afife Theatre Awards: "Best Supporting Actress in a Musical/Comedy" - Cam, Aysa Production Theatre - 2011
 21st International Ankara Film Festival: "Best Supporting Actress" - 2010
 15th Adana Golden Boll Film Festival: "Best Actress" - Ara - 2008
 20th Sadri Alışık Theatre and Cinema Awards: "Best Theatre Actress in a Supporting Role" (Comedy or Musical) - Kurusıkı, BKM

Theatre 
 Kurusıkı : Levent Kazak - 2014 
 Kuçu Kuçu : Fabrice Roger-Lacan - Aysa Production Theatre - 2012
 The New Tenant : Eugène Ionesco - Bi Theatre - 2012
 Cam : Levent Kazak - Aysa Production Theatre - 2010
 Bug : Tracy Letts - DOT - 2005
 Kantocu : Haldun Dormen - Istanbul City Theatres - 2005

Filmography 
 Kara Tahta - Münevver (2022)
 Dilberay (2022)
 Leyla ile Mecnun - Feraye (2021)
 Evlilik Hakkında Her Şey - Songül (2021–2022)
 Masumiyet - Yelda Demirci (2021)
 Menajerimi Ara (2020)
 Aşk, Büyü vs - Ümit Ünal (2019)
 Leke - Serpil Zengin (2019)
 Koca Koca Yalanlar - Nilgün (2018)
 Altınsoylar - Şaziye (2016)
 Beni Böyle Sev - Eda (2013–2015)
 İffet : Faruk Teber - Gülin
 Hanımın Çiftliği : Faruk Teber - Asuman
 Deli Saraylı : Tarkan Karlıdağ - Servant Kiraz
 Büyük Oyun : Atıl İnanç - Amira
 Kıskanmak : Zeki Demirkubuz
 11'e 10 Kala : Pelin Esmer - Mahinur
 Bornova Bornova : İnan Temelkuran - Senem
 Kahve Bahane : Deniz
 Ses : Ümit Ünal
 Binbir Gece : Kudret Sabancı - Emel
 O... Çocukları : Murat Saraçoğlu - Selvi
 Düğün Şarkıcısı : Burcu
 Zincirbozan : Atıl İnanç - Aynur
 Dicle : 
 Ara : Ümit Ünal - Gül
 Fedai : Gülşen
 Karınca Yuvası : Zerrin
 Anlat İstanbul : Selim Demirdelen - Rahşan
 Bir İstanbul Masalı : Ömür Atay
 Böyle Bitmesin (guest appearance)

References

External links 
 
 

1983 births
Turkish film actresses
Turkish stage actresses
Turkish television actresses
Living people
St. George's Austrian High School alumni
Boğaziçi University alumni